Greenways is a town and a locality in the Australian state of South Australia located in the state's south-east within the Limestone Coast region about  south east of the state capital of Adelaide and about  east of the municipal seat of Robe.

The 2016 Australian census which was conducted in August 2016 reports that Greenways had a population of 36 people.

Greenways is located within the federal division of Barker, the state electoral district of MacKillop and the local government area of the District Council of Robe.

References

Towns in South Australia
Limestone Coast